Jan Patricia Bolwell  (born 1949) is a Wellington-based New Zealand playwright, choreographer, director, dancer and teacher of dance. She established the Crows Feet Dance Collective in 1999 and remains its director.

Biography 
Bolwell was born on the South Island in Oamaru but grew up in Dunedin where she was educated at Columba College. She then completed a Bachelor of Arts at the University of Otago, majoring in history.

Having set up and run the dance curriculum for the Dunedin College of Education she was promoted to senior lecturer, before moving to the Wellington College of Education as head of performing arts from 1987 to 1997.

In 2018 she directed Kate JasonSmith in I'll Tell You This For Nothing: My mother the war hero, a play written by JasonSmith about her mother's experiences in World War II, performed at BATS Theatre in Wellington.

Awards and recognition 
In 1995, with Sunny Amey and Keri Kaa, she won Production of the Year in the Chapman Tripp Theatre Awards for Takitoru.

Bolwell was appointed an Officer of the New Zealand Order of Merit for "service to dance and theatre" in the 2020 New Years Honours.

Plays 

 Standing on My Hands
 Here's Hilda! – writer and performer, 2007
 Double Portrait: Finding Frances Hodgkins – writer, first performed 2009
 Dancing In The Wake: The Story of Lucia Joyce – writer, first performed 2012

Published work 

 Milord Goffredo (2002) - Published by Steele Roberts, Wellington, NZ,  (pbk.)
 A pretty piece of driving : Hilda Gardiner, my grandmother (2005) - Published by Steele Roberts, Wellington, NZ,

References

External links 

 

1949 births
Living people
New Zealand choreographers
New Zealand dancers
Officers of the New Zealand Order of Merit
People from Oamaru
Entertainers from Dunedin
University of Otago alumni
People educated at Columba College